Screamfeeder is an Australian indie guitar pop group formed in Brisbane in 1991. The band's original line-up was composed of drummer Tony Blades, bassist/vocalist Kellie Lloyd and vocalist/guitarist Tim Steward. In 1995, Dean Shwereb replaced Blades on drums. Darek Mudge later joined on lead guitar from 2001 to 2005, and eventually rejoined in 2014. Screamfeeder have released seven studio albums: Flour (June 1992), Burn Out Your Name (August 1993), Fill Yourself With Music (1995), Kitten Licks (1996), Rocks on the Soul (2000), Take You Apart (2003) and Pop Guilt (2017).

History 

Screamfeeder were formed in August of 1991 in Brisbane. Blades and Steward had previously been members of The Madmen, which formed in 1988 in Townsville with Bruce Gardner on guitar and vocals and Jeff Johnson on bass guitar. In 1989, Cam Hurst replaced Johnson on bass guitar and Gardner left. They released three singles and an extended play, Thunder Egg (1990), on their own label, Stone Groove. The Madmen toured Queensland numerous times, before relocating to Brisbane in 1989. When Hurst was replaced by Lloyd, the trio became Screamfeeder. Lloyd had previously made a filmclip for The Madmen, Tower..

Screamfeeder signed with Sydney-based label Survival Records and issued their debut studio album, Flour, in June 1992. One track, "Walking Through the Village", had been recorded back in June 1990 by the Madmen (with Hurst on bass guitar) at Pyramid Studios, and was co-produced by Steward and Murray Nash. The other tracks were recorded between November 1991 and the following January at Vibrafeel Studios with Mick Borkowski as producer, audio engineer and mastering engineer.

The Canberra Times wrote in January 1993 that Flour "captured the raw sound of Screamfeeder while displaying the inherent depth, feeling and power within the music. Influences within Screamfeeder range from Swervedriver to Hüsker Dü to Bitch Magnet and beyond. The songs on the album forge a path of intense feeling, crossing the ground from sublime melodies to sonic punishment." Flour was later remastered and re-released in 2014 by the Melbourne-based Poison City Records.

Their second album, Burn Out Your Name, was released in August 1993. It provided the single, "Fingers and Toes", in the same month. Pemberton Roach of AllMusic described their sound "it's pretty clear from the album's first song that the group has put in some serious hours listening to Hüsker Dü records. From the ringing distorto guitar to the throat-slashing, top-of-the-range Bob Mould-esque vocals, Screamfeeder has the Minnepolis  trio's sound down better than anyone this side of Overwhelming Colorfast." Screamfeeder toured Europe with Screaming Tribesmen and The Chevelles later that year, and played the Big Day Out for the first time in January 1994. The band would go on to play the festival a further three times in 1997, 1998 and 1999.

In 1995, Dean Shwereb replaced Tony Blades on the drums, and the band toured to promote Fill Yourself With Music and wrote and recorded Kitten Licks. The rest of the 90s saw the band support acts such as Rollins Band, Sonic Youth, Ride and Pavement.

It was announced in January 2022 that drummer Dean Shwereb was stepping away from the band after a 25-year tenure. He was replaced by Phil Usher from Brisbane bands Grand Atlantic, Sacred Shrines and The Far Outs, as well as Sydney’s Sounds Like Sunset. The following month, the band announced their first album in five years, Five Rooms, would be released on 6 May 2022.

Discography

Studio albums

Live albums

Compilations

Extended plays

References

External links

 
 Screamfeeder YouTube Channel
 Screamfeeder Facebook

Australian rock music groups
Musical groups from Brisbane
Low Transit Industries artists